Donald Whitehead may refer to:

 Donald S. Whitehead (1888–1957), Republican politician from Idaho
 Donald R. Whitehead (1938–1990), American entomologist
Don Whitehead (1908–1981), American journalist